Innocent Linda Buthelezi (born 28 June 1969) is a South African former footballer who played at both professional and international levels as a midfielder. Buthelezi played club football for Jomo Cosmos, Kaizer Chiefs, Karabükspor, Orlando Pirates, Mamelodi Sundowns and SuperSport United. He went on unsuccessful trials at South Korean Pohang Atoms.

He also earned 27 caps for the South African national side between 1994 and 1997. He was part of the squad that won the 1996 African Cup of Nations and made unwanted international headlines in 1997 when a tackle on Paul Gascoigne saw the English midfielder stretchered off.

References

External links

1969 births
Living people
South African soccer players
South Africa international soccer players
1996 African Cup of Nations players
Mamelodi Sundowns F.C. players
Orlando Pirates F.C. players
Jomo Cosmos F.C. players
Association football midfielders